The CSMSS College of Polytechnic is a technical-education institute in the city of Aurangabad, Maharashtra, India. It was established in 2009 with 5 diploma programs and a sanctioned intake of 390 students. The institute is affiliated with the MSBTE and managed by the CSMSS. The college takes its name from a ruler of the Maratha Empire, Chhatrapati Shahu Maharaj. It has been accredited by the DTE.

Sponsoring organization
The Chhatrapati Shahu Maharaj Shikshan Sanstha (CSMSS) ("Chhatrapati Shahu Maharaj Institute of Education") was established in 1986 and was named after a renowned ruler and social worker of the Maratha Empire - Chhatrapati Shahu Maharaj.

Other colleges
CSMSS College Of Agriculture
CSMSS College Of Dental
CSMSS College Of Ayurveda
CSMSS College Of Polytechnic
CSMSS College  Of Engineering

Departments 
 Civil Engineering 
 Computer Engineering 
 Mechanical Engineering
 Electronics and Telecommunications Engineering 
 Electrical Engineering

See also
 DTE

References

Engineering colleges in Maharashtra